Crataegus apiifolia is an illegitimate name for two species of hawthorns:

 Crataegus marshallii, parsley hawthorn 
 Crataegus monogyna, common hawthorn 

apiifolia